Charles Humbert (28 May 1866, Loison, Meuse – 1 November 1927) was a French army captain, tax collector, Senator and newspaper proprietor.

Biography
Humbert's mother was a domestic servant Marie Clémentine Duchet, and he was first given her surname, Duchet; but his name was changed when his mother married Casimir Humbert in 1868. His father died a year later.

Humbert was a self-made man. His first job was in a café, but he enlisted himself in the army and became a captain. He attracted the attention of General André who made him his aide-de-camp, and in 1900, when André became Minister for War, he received a post under him. He played an important part in the series of inquiries instigated by General André into the religious and political views of officers.  After two years he resigned owing to the controversy caused by his opposition to Freemasonry in the army, and became a tax collector. He entered journalism, becoming secretary to "Le Matin". In 1906 he was elected deputy for the Meuse Département, then two years later a senator of the Third Republic, becoming vice-president of the senate army commission. Before World War I he wrote much on military subjects, and made speeches criticising the inadequacy of the defences of the French Army, and the insufficiency of officers and munitions. When the war began in 1914 he became director of "Le Journal".  His slogan was "Des canons, des munitions!" He was awarded the Légion d'honneur.

Bolo Pasha Trial 

In the spring of 1918 Humbert was involved in a controversy involving money supplied to "Le Journal" and proposals by Bolo Pasha who had been executed in the war as a German agent. In a much-publicised case, Humbert was brought before a Court-martial but was acquitted.

Family 
Humbert was a sub-lieutenant in the 119th Infantry garrisoned in Dieppe when he married an Englishwoman, Mabel Wells Annie Rooke, daughter of William Rooke and Fanny Drew, and granddaughter of Joseph Drew. They had one son, Charles William Humbert, and one daughter, Agnès Humbert, born in Dieppe in 1894. Humbert and his wife divorced in 1908, and he then married Marie Levylier (née Nathan, 1872–1920). He died at his home in Paris on 1 November 1927, and is buried in Batignolles Cemetery.

Writings 
 Sommes-nous défendus? ("Are we defended?") (1907)
 La flotte fantôme: ni bateaux, ni canons, ni obus ("The phantom fleet: no ships, no guns, no shells") (1909)
 L'œuvre française aux colonies, Paris, Larousse (1913, reprinted 2013)

Bibliography 
All books written in French
Jean El Gammal, François Roth, Jean-Claude Delbriel, Dictionnaire des parlementaires lorrains de la Troisième République, Éd. Serpenoise, Metz, 2006, 422 p. 
Jean André Faucher et Noël Jacquemart, Le Quatrième pouvoir, la presse française de 1830 à 1960, L'Écho de la presse et de la publicité, Saint-Germain l'Auxerrois, 1969, p. 69-70
Lucien Graux, Les fausses nouvelles de la grande guerre, t. 1, L'Édition française illustrée, 1919
Marie Roux, Le défaitisme et les manoeuvres proallemandes 1914-1917, Nouvelle librairie nationale, 1918, 128 p.
Léon Schirmann, Les manipulations judiciaires de la Grande Guerre : comment on fabrique des coupables, Éditions Italiques, Triel-sur-Seine, 2006, 292 p. 
Jacques Chabannes, Les Scandales de la Troisième, de Panama à Stavisky, Perrin, 1972, 347 p.

External links 
  Website of the French Senate: Charles Humbert
  Mémoires de l'Académie de Stanislas, Tome XVIII Memoirs of the Académie de Stanislas, p. 443, Captain Charles Humbert, Lecture by Michel Maigret, 16 April 2004

References 

1866 births
1927 deaths
People from Meuse (department)
French Senators of the Third Republic
Politicians of the French Third Republic
French people of World War I
Senators of Meuse (department)
Burials at Batignolles Cemetery